The Sony Xperia XA Ultra is an Android smartphone manufactured by Sony Mobile Communications. It was announced in May 2016 and was released in July 2016.

Specifications

Hardware

The device features a  1080p screen, also features a 64-bit 2.0 GHz octa-core Mediatek MT6755 (Helio P10) system-on-chip with 3 GB of RAM. The device also has 16 or 32  GB internal storage with microSD card expansion up to 256 GB and includes non-removable 2700 mAh battery.

The rear-facing camera of the Xperia XA Ultra is 21.5 megapixels with sensor size of 1/2.4 inch, featuring Sony Exmor RS IMX258 image sensor with quick launch and also features hybrid autofocus that utilizes phase detection autofocus that can focus the object within 0.03 seconds. The front-facing camera is 16 megapixels with sensor size of 1/2.6-inch, featuring Sony Exmor RS IMX234 image sensor and 88-degree depth of field. The front facing camera also features an LED flash and Optical Image Stabilization. The rear-facing camera, however, does not feature optical image stabilization.

Software
The Xperia XA Ultra is preinstalled with Android 6.0.1 Marshmallow with Sony's custom interface and software. On August 23, 2016, Sony announced that the Xperia XA Ultra would receive an upgrade to Android 7.0 Nougat. On June 15, 2017, it was reported that Android Nougat was rolling out to the Xperia XA Ultra.

Variants 

Here are the complete description of the Xperia XA Ultra variants in the world:

Release dates 

The Sony Xperia XA Ultra was released in various markets, including USA, India, Hong Kong and Taiwan on 27 July 2016.

See also 
Sony Xperia X
Sony Xperia X Performance
Sony Xperia XA
Sony Xperia C5 Ultra

References

External links 

Official Press Release
Official Whitepaper 
Official Whitepaper (Dual SIM version)

Android (operating system) devices
XA Ultra